The Butler Range is a subrange of the Finlay Ranges of the Omineca Mountains, located on the west side of Finlay Reach in northern British Columbia, Canada.

Butler Range was named for Captain W.F.Butler who ascended the Peace Range in 1872.

References

Butler Range in the Canadian Mountain Encyclopedia

Omineca Mountains